Pian di Scò is a frazione (municipality) in the Province of Arezzo in the Italian region Tuscany, located about  southeast of Florence and about  northwest of Arezzo, in the Valdarno. It was a separate commune until 2014, when it was  merged with Castelfranco di Sopra: the new municipality name is Castelfranco Piandiscò.

It has around 1955 inhabitants in 2001.

Main sights
Pieve of Santa Maria a Scò. Documented from as early as 1008, is a medieval  Pleban church  located an Etruscan ancient road, partially. It has one nave and two aisles in Romanesque style; the capital of the internal columns are decorated with vegetable, animal and anthropomorphic figures. Artworks include a fresco of Madonna Enthroned with the Child by Paolo Schiavo.

References
 

Frazioni of the Province of Arezzo
2014 disestablishments in Italy